Al-Nahyan Stadium is a multi-purpose stadium in Abu Dhabi, United Arab Emirates.  It is also known as Al Wahda stadium.

It is currently used mostly for football matches and is the home ground of Al Wahda. The stadium holds 15,000 people and was built in 1995. The stadium also hosted group games of the 2003 FIFA World Youth Championship.

The stadium was renovated for the 2019 AFC Asian Cup.

2019 AFC Asian Cup
Al Nahyan Stadium hosted five games of the 2019 AFC Asian Cup, including a Round of 16 game.

External links

 StadiumDB images

References

Nahyan
Multi-purpose stadiums in the United Arab Emirates
Sports venues in Abu Dhabi